Uzi Geller (born 27 January 1931, in kibbutz Givat Chaim, Mandatory Palestine) is an Israeli chess master.

He was Israeli Champion in 1971/72. He tied for 7–10th at Netanya 1968 (Bobby Fischer won), tied for 9–10th at Netanya 1969 (Samuel Reshevsky won), took 16th at Netanya 1971 (Lubomir Kavalek and Bruno Parma won), and tied for 6–7th at Teheran 1972 (West Asian zonal, Shimon Kagan won).

Uzi Geller twice represented Israel in Chess Olympiads:
 In 1970, at fourth board in 19th Chess Olympiad in Siegen (+5 –3 =4);
 In 1972, at third board in 20th Chess Olympiad in Skopje (+1 –5 =1).

References

External links 

1931 births
Living people
Israeli Jews
Israeli chess players
Jewish chess players